Calosoma lepidum is a species of ground beetle in the subfamily Carabinae. It was described by John Lawrence LeConte in 1844.

References

lepidum
Beetles described in 1844